A bookpress is either:

 a screw press used in the binding or rebinding of books
 an early form of bookcase, used in medieval cloisters, to which books were attached using a chain

Bookbinding